The Qanats of Ghasabeh, also called Kariz e Kay Khosrow, is one of the world's oldest and largest networks of qanats (underground aqueducts). The site was first added to UNESCO's list of tentative World Heritage Sites in 2007, then officially inscribed in 2016, collectively with several other qanats, as "The Persian Qanat".

History 
Qanat Ghasabe has a link to the legendary king of Iran Kay Khosrow. Many historical and geographical sources mention two main wars in Gonabad region during the time of Kay Khosrow. Davazdah Rokh war and Froad war had been mentioned in Shahnameh. According to Nasir Khusraw, the qanat of Gonabad was built by the order of Kay Khosrow

Persian period 

The use of water clocks in Iran, especially in the Qanats of Gonabad and Kariz Zibad, dates back to 500 BCE. Later they were also used to determine the exact holy days of pre-Islamic religions, such as the Nowruz, Chelah, or Yaldā—the shortest, longest, and equal-length days and nights of the year. The water clock, or Fenjaan, was the most accurate and commonly used timekeeping device for calculating the amount or the time that a farmer must take water from the Qanats of Gonabad until it was replaced by more accurate current clocks.

Nasir Khusraw (1003–1077), in his book Safarnama, described the Qanats of Gonabad as the Kariz of Kai Khosrow, claiming the qanats were dug by the order of the legendary Persian king Kai Khosrow. According to a contemporaneous inscription, in 714 BCE Sargon II of Assyria invaded the city of Uhlu lying in the northwest of Uroomiye lake that lay in the territory of Urartu, and he noticed that the occupied area enjoyed a very rich vegetation even though there was no river running across it. In fact it was Ursa, the king of the region, who had rescued the people from thirst and turned Uhlu into a prosperous and green land. Goblot believes that the influence of the Medeans and Achaemenids made the technology of qanats spread from Urartu (in northwest Iran and near the present border between Iran and Turkey) across the Iranian plateau.

It was an Achaemenid ruling that in case someone succeeded in constructing a qanat and bringing groundwater to the surface in order to cultivate land, or in renovating an abandoned qanat, the tax he was supposed to pay the government would be waived not only for him but also for his successors for up to five generations. Following Darius' order, Silaks, the naval commander of the Persian army, and Khenombiz, the royal architect, managed to construct a qanat in the oasis of Kharagha in Egypt. Beadnell believes that qanat construction dates back to two distinct periods: they were first constructed by the Persianse, and later the Romans dug other qanats during their reign in Egypt from 30 BCE to 395 AD. The magnificent temple built in this area during Darius' reign shows that there was a considerable population depending on the water of qanats; Ragerz has estimated this population to be 10,000 people. The most reliable document confirming the existence of qanats at this time was written by Polybius, who states that: "the streams are running down from everywhere at the base of Alborz mountain, and people have transferred too much water from a long distance through some subterranean canals by spending much cost and labor". The government proceeded to repair or dredge the qanats that were abandoned or destroyed for any reason, and construct new qanats if necessary. A document written in the Pahlavi language pointed out the important role of qanats in developing the cities at that time.

Islamic period

In Iran, the advent of Islam, which coincided with the overthrow of the Sassanid dynasty, brought about a profound change in religious, political, social and cultural structures. But the qanats stayed intact, because the economic infrastructure was of great importance to the Arabs. As an instance, M. Lombard reports that the Moslem clerics who lived during the Abbasid period, such as Abooyoosef Ya’qoob (died 798 AD) stipulated that whoever can bring water to the idle lands in order to cultivate, his tax would be waived and he would be entitled to the lands cultivated. Therefore, this policy did not differ from that of the Achaemenids in not getting any tax from the people who revived abandoned lands. The Arabs' supportive policy on qanats was so successful that even the holy city of Mecca gained a qanat. The Persian historian Hamdollah Mostowfi writes: "Zobeyde Khatoon (Haroon al-Rashid’s wife) constructed a qanat in Mecca. After the time of Haroon al-Rashid, during the caliph Moghtader’s reign this qanat fell into decay, but he rehabilitated it, and the qanat was rehabilitated again after it collapsed during the reign of two other caliphs named Ghaem and Naser. After the era of the caliphs this qanat completely fell into ruin because the desert sand filled it up, but later Amir Choopan repaired the qanat and made it flow again in Mecca".

There are also other historical texts proving that the Abbasids were concerned about qanats. For example, according to the "Incidents of Abdollah bin Tahir’s Time" written by Gardizi, in the year 830 AD a terrible earthquake struck the town of Forghaneh and reduced many homes to rubble. The inhabitants of Neyshaboor used to come to Abdollah bin Tahir in order to request him to intervene, for they fought over their qanats and found the relevant instruction or law on qanat as a solution neither in the prophet's quotations nor in the clerics' writings. So Abdollah bin Tahir managed to bring together all the clergymen from throughout Khorasan and Iraq to compile a book entitled Alghani (The Book of Qanat). This book collected all the rulings on qanats which could be of use to whoever wanted to judge a dispute over this issue. Gardizi added that this book was still applicable to his time, and everyone made references to this book.

Apart from the Book of Alghani, which is considered a law booklet focusing on qanat-related rulings based on Islamic principles, there is another book about groundwater written by Karaji in the year 1010. This book, entitled Extraction of Hidden Waters, examines just the technical issues associated with the qanat and tries to answer common questions such as how to construct and repair a qanat, how to find a groundwater supply, how to do leveling, etc. Some of the hydrogeological innovations described in this book were first introduced there. There are some records dating back to that time, signifying their concern about the legal vicinity of qanats. For example, Mohammad bin Hasan quotes Aboo-Hanifeh that in case someone constructs a qanat in abandoned land, someone else can dig another qanat in the same land on the condition that the second qanat is 500 zera' (375 meters) away from the first one.

Ms. Lambton quotes Moeen al-din Esfarzi, who wrote the book Rowzat al-Jannat ("The Garden of Paradise"), that Abdollah bin Tahir (from the Taherian dynasty) and Ismaeel Ahmed Samani (from the Samani dynasty) had several qanats constructed in Neyshaboor. Later, in the 11th century, a writer named Nasir Khosrow acknowledged all those qanats with the following words: "Neyshaboor is located in a vast plain at a distance of 40 Farsang (~240 km) from Serakhs and 70 Farsang (~420 km) from Mary (Marv) ... all the qanats of this city run underground, and it is said that an Arab who was offended by the people of Neyshaboor has complained that; what a beautiful city Neyshaboor could have become if its qanats would have flowed on the ground surface and instead its people would have been underground". These documents all certify the importance of qanats during Islamic history within the cultural territories of Iran.

There is a 14th-century book entitled Al-Vaghfiya Al-Rashidiya ("Rashid's Deeds of Endowment") that names all the properties located in Yazd, Shiraz, Maraghe, Tabriz, Isfahan, and Mowsel that Rashid Fazl-Allah donated to the public or religious places. This book mentions many qanats running at that time and irrigating a considerable area of farmland. At the same time, another book, entitled Jame' al-Kheyrat, was written by Seyyed Rokn al-Din on the same subject as Rashid's book. In this book, Seyyed Rokn al-Din names the properties he donated in the region of Yazd. These deeds of endowment indicate that much attention was given to the qanats during the reign of Ilkhanids, but it is attributable to their Persian ministers, who influenced them.

Pahlavi period

During the Pahlavi period, the process of qanat construction and maintenance continued. A council that was responsible for the qanats was set up by the government. At that time most of the qanats belonged to landlords. In fact, feudalism was the prevailing system in the rural regions. The peasants were not entitled to the lands they worked on, but were considered only as the users of the lands. They had to pay rent for land and water to the landlords who could afford to finance all the proceedings required to maintain the qanats, for they were relatively wealthy. According to the report of Safi Asfiya, who was in charge of supervising the qanats of Iran in the former regime, in the year 1942 Iran had 40,000 qanats with a total discharge of 600,000 liters per second or 18.2 billion cubic meters per year. In 1961, another report was published revealing that in Iran there were 30,000 qanats of which just 20,000 were still in use, with a total output of 560,000 lit/se or 17.3 billion cubic meters per year. In 1959 a reforme program named as the White Revolution was declared by the former Shah. One of the articles of this program addressed the land reform that let peasants take ownership of part of the landlords' lands. In fact, the land reform meant that the landlords lost their motivation for investing more money in constructing or repairing the qanats which were subject to the Lnd Reform Law. On the other hand, the peasants could not come up with the money to maintain the qanats, so many qanats were gradually abandoned. The introduction of modern devices, that made it possible to drill many deep wells and extract groundwater much more quickly, accelerated the qanats' destruction. The pumped wells had a negative impact on the qanats due to their overexploitation of the groundwater. These changes, that occurred in Mohammad Reza Shah's reign, inflicted great damage on the qanats of the country so that many qanats vanished forever. The statistics related to 14,778 qanats estimates the overall discharge of these qanats to be 6.2 billion cubic meters per year between the years 1972 and 1973. If we assume the total number of the qanats at that time to be 32,000, their annual discharge would have amounted to 12 billion cubic meters.

In 1963, the Ministry of Water and Electricity was established in order to provide the rural and urban areas of the country with sufficient water and electricity. Later, this Ministry was renamed the Ministry of Energy. Three years later, in 1966, the parliament passed a law protecting groundwater resources. According to this law, the Ministry of Water and Electricity was allowed to ban drilling any deep or semi-deep wells wherever surveys showed that the water table was dropping because of overpumping. In fact, this law was passed only after the growing number of the pumped wells sounded the alarm about overpumping and depletion of groundwater leading to the decline in qanat' flow all over the country. This law, as well as the Law of Water Nationalization that was approved in 1968, and eventually the Law of Fair Distribution of water passed (in 1981) after the Islamic revolution emphasized the definition of restricted and free areas for drilling. In the restricted areas, drilling any wells (except for drinking and industry) was prohibited in order to prevent the continuous depletion of groundwater. So the rest of the qanats had a better chance to survive.

In the years 1984–1985, the ministry of energy took census of 28,038 qanats, whose total discharge was 9 billion cubic meters. In the years 1992–1993, a census of 28,054 qanats showed a total discharge of 10 billion cubic meters. Ten years later, in 2002–2003, the number of qanats was reported as 33,691 with a total discharge of 8 billion cubic meters.

In the year 2000, holding the International Conference on Qanats in Yazd drew a lot of attention to the qanats. In 2005 the Iranian government and UNESCO signed an agreement to set up the International Center on Qanats and Historic Hydraulic Structures (ICQHS) under the auspices of UNESCO. The main mission of this center is the recognition, transfer of knowledge and experiences, promotion of information and capacities with regard to all aspects of qanat technology and related historic hydraulic structures. This mission aims to fulfill sustainable development of water resources and the application of the outcome of the activities in order to preserve historical and cultural values as well as the promotion of the public welfare within the communities whose existence depends on the rational exploitation of the resources and preservation of such historical structures.

Ghasabe Qanat of Gonabad   

The documentary film of the Ghasabe  Qanat of Gonabad (70 minutes movie) illustrates the engineering potential of Iranian diggers to dig aqueducts throughout history, explaining its importance. The story of the Ghasabe aqueduct in water supply in desert conditions is illustrated in this movie. By documenting the aqueduct of the Ghasabe Qanat, it has been attempted to illustrate the potential of the Gonabad excavation and its continued importance throughout history. The film is based on the memoirs of many years of travel and residence of French scholar Henri Goblot in the mid-twentieth century and Visit the Iranian aqueducts. This documentary film was produced by radio and television of Khorasan-e-Razavi Province in collaboration with Khorasan-e-Razavi Province Cultural Heritage and Tourism administration; commissioned by UNESCO. And made by Seyedsaeed Aboozarian known as (Payman Ashegh) as Production Manager / Translator and Narrator of French; and Saeed Tavakkolifar as Director.

References

Sources
Iranian newspaper farheekhtegan 21/May 2016 No 1949 
Iranian newspaper Mardom salari18Feb 2016 Qantas or kariz in Gonabad 
Qanats and its tools waterclock 
Qanat Gonabad or Kariz Kai Khosrow 
pars documentary 

Persian developed underground aqueducts
Water wells
Infrastructure in Iran
World Heritage Sites in Iran
Buildings and structures in Razavi Khorasan Province
Tourist attractions in Razavi Khorasan Province